East Beach may refer to:

Places
 East Beach, Washington, a community near Olympic National Park in the United States
 East Beach (Santa Barbara), a coastal area in California, United States
 East Beach State Beach, a recreation area in Rhode Island, United States
 East Beach Station, a Coast Guard facility in St. Simons, Georgia, United States

Organizations
 East Beach Cafe, a restaurant in Littlehampton, West Sussex, United Kingdom

See also
 Cedar Lake East Beach, a park area in Minneapolis, United States
 Selsey, East Beach, a geological site in West Sussex, United Kingdom